RCP Advisors is a private equity investment firm that provides access to lower middle market private equity fund managers through primary funds-of-funds, secondary funds, co-investment funds, advisory services, and investment research services.

References

External links 
 
 

Financial services companies established in 2001
Private equity firms of the United States
Companies based in Chicago